Bullard-Havens Technical High School, or Bullard-Havens Tech, is a technical high school, part of the Connecticut Technical High School System. Located at the east end of Bridgeport, it serves the region of southwestern Connecticut. The school attracts students from all over the state due to its extensive Career and Technical Education programs and rigorous academics. Each student has the opportunity to participate in athletics, activities and Work-Based Learning programs.

Technologies

In addition to a complete academic program leading to a high school diploma, students attending Bullard-Havens Tech receive training in one of the following trades and technologies:

Automotive Technology
Baking and Culinary Arts
Carpentry
Criminal Justice and Protective Services
Electrical
Graphics Technology
Hairdressing and Cosmetology
Health Technology
Masonry
Information Systems Technology
Plumbing and Heating
Precision Machining Technology
Sustainable Architecture

Adult Education
They currently offer the following full-time adult education programs:
Apprenticeship and Extension Courses  
Certified Nurse Assistant  
Licensed Practical Nurse

History

References

Education in Bridgeport, Connecticut
Schools in Fairfield County, Connecticut
Educational institutions established in 1936
Public high schools in Connecticut
1936 establishments in Connecticut
Educational institutions accredited by the Council on Occupational Education